The Journal of Pain Research is an international, peer-reviewed scientific journal focusing on  pain research and the prevention and management of pain. The journal was established in 2008 and is published by Dove Medical Press.

External links 
 

Neurology journals
English-language journals
Open access journals
Dove Medical Press academic journals
Anesthesiology and palliative medicine journals
Publications established in 2008